Autumn Gardens is an orchestral work by Finnish composer Einojuhani Rautavaara.

Written in 1999, it is one of Rautavaara's most performed works.

In the performance notes, Rautavaara writes, "I have often compared composing to gardening. In both processes, one observes and controls organic growth rather than constructing or assembling existing components and elements. I would also like to think that my compositions are rather like ‘English gardens’, freely growing and organic, as opposed to those that are pruned to geometric precision and severity."

Movements
The piece is in three movements.

I. Poetico

II. Tranquillo

III. Giocoso leggiero

Instrumentation
Woodwinds
2 Flutes
2 Oboes
2 Clarinets
2 Bassoons
Brass
2 French Horns
Tuba
Percussion
Timpani
Vibraphone
Strings
16 Violins
8 Violas
8 Cellos
4 Basses

See also
Cantus Arcticus

References

Compositions by Einojuhani Rautavaara
1999 compositions